Heliodomidae is a family of bryozoans belonging to the order Cheilostomatida.

Genera:
 Heliodoma Calvet, 1907
 Setosellina Calvet, 1906

References

Cheilostomatida